The UR GC class, later known as the UR / KUR EB2 class, was a class of  gauge  steam locomotives built by Nasmyth, Wilson and Company in Patricroft, Salford, England, for the Uganda Railway (UR).  Its design was very similar to that of the earlier UR G class and UR GB class, save that the two members of the GC class were equipped with piston valves and a Robinson superheater.

The GC class entered service on the UR in 1921, and continued in service after the UR was renamed the Kenya-Uganda Railway (KUR) in 1926.  The two GC class locomotives were heavily worked as trial engines, and then written off in 1934 after proving the value of superheating.  With the exception of the KUR ED1 class shunting engines, all further steam engines ordered by the KUR and its successor, the East African Railways (EAR), were superheated.

See also

Rail transport in Kenya
Rail transport in Uganda

References

Notes

Bibliography

Kenya-Uganda Railway locomotives
Metre gauge steam locomotives
Nasmyth, Wilson and Company locomotives
Railway locomotives introduced in 1921
Steam locomotives of Kenya
Steam locomotives of Uganda
Uganda Railway locomotives
4-8-0 locomotives
Scrapped locomotives